The 1896 United States presidential election in Washington took place on November 3, 1896. All contemporary 45 states were part of the 1896 United States presidential election. State voters chose four electors to the Electoral College, which selected the president and vice president.

Washington was won by the Democratic nominees, former U.S. Representative William Jennings Bryan of Nebraska and his running mate Arthur Sewall of Maine. Two electors cast their vice presidential ballots for Thomas E. Watson.

As a result of his win in the state, Bryan would become the first Democratic presidential candidate to win Washington state. He would later lose the state against McKinley in 1900 and then against William Howard Taft in 1908. The state would not vote Democratic again until 1916.

This is the last time the losing candidate won a majority of Clallam County votes.

Results

Results by county

See also
 United States presidential elections in Washington (state)

Notes

References

Washington (state)
1896
1896 Washington (state) elections